Gary Owen Darrell (born 10 January 1947) is a Bermudian retired association football player and manager who played in the North American Soccer League.

Club career
Darrell began his professional career in Bermuda where he played for the Wellington Rovers and Devonshire Colts. In 1972, he signed with the Montreal Olympique of the North American Soccer League. In 1974, he moved to the Washington Diplomats where he played along Johan Cruyff among others and totaled seven seasons including some indoor.

International career
Darrell also played international football for Bermuda and managed the Bermuda national teams after his retirement as a player.

References

External links
 NASL career stats
 Tampa Bay Rowdies: Gary Darrell

1947 births
Living people
Bermudian footballers
Bermudian expatriate footballers
Bermuda international footballers
Montreal Olympique players
Washington Diplomats (NASL) players
North American Soccer League (1968–1984) indoor players
North American Soccer League (1968–1984) players
People from Hamilton, Bermuda
Expatriate soccer players in the United States
Bermudian expatriate sportspeople in the United States
Expatriate soccer players in Canada
Bermudian expatriate sportspeople in Canada
Bermuda national football team managers
Pan American Games silver medalists for Bermuda
Pan American Games medalists in football
Association football defenders
Footballers at the 1967 Pan American Games
Bermudian football managers
Medalists at the 1967 Pan American Games